Union, Pennsylvania may refer to:

Allenwood, Pennsylvania
A village in Colerain Township, Lancaster County, Pennsylvania
Union County, Pennsylvania
Union Township, Washington County, Pennsylvania